The Okanagan Regional Library (ORL) system serves the Okanagan region of the Canadian province of British Columbia. Its administrative headquarters are in Kelowna.  The system covers 59,000 square kilometers of area, and serves 360,000 people through 29 branches. ORL was founded in 1936. In 2013, the library held 3.2 million physical items.  The library is largely funded through tax revenues from four administrative areas, the Regional District of North Okanagan, the Regional District of Central Okanagan, the Columbia-Shuswap Regional District, and the Regional District of Okanagan Similkameen. It also receives funding from the provincial and federal governments.

In 2017, the ORL collaborated with the University of British Columbia Okanagan (UBCO) to open an on-campus branch to serve the UBCO community.

Locations
 Armstrong
 Cherryville
 Enderby
 Falkland
 Golden
 Hedley
 Kaleden
 Kelowna
 Keremeos
 Lake Country
 Lumby
 Mission Branch
 Naramata
 North Shuswap
 Okanagan Falls
 Oliver
 Osoyoos
 Oyama
 Peachland
 Princeton
 Revelstoke
 Rutland
 Salmon Arm
 Sicamous
 Silver Creek
 South Shuswap
 Summerland
 University of British Columbia Okanagan
 Vernon
 Westbank
 Westside Learning Lab

History 
In 1935, residents of the Okanagan participated in a referendum to decide whether to start a library system in the valley. After a majority voted "yes", the first Kelowna library, then called the Okanagan Union Library, was constructed. The original collection was 18,000 items, and served a population of about 25,000.

References

Further reading 
 A Short History of the Okanagan Regional Library, 1935-1984, William Peter Lofts
 Library Service in British Columbia: A Brief History of Its Development, Marjorie C. Holmes

External links 
 ORL website

Public libraries in British Columbia
Culture of Kelowna
Buildings and structures in Kelowna
Libraries established in 1936
1936 establishments in Canada